Philippa is a feminine given name meaning "lover of horses" or "horses' friend". Common alternative spellings include Filippa and Phillipa. Less common is Filipa and even Philippe (cf. the French spelling of Philippa of Guelders: Philippe de Gueldres). It is the feminine form of the masculine name Philip. It is composed of the Greek elements philein (to love) and hippos (horse), and is derived from the name of Alexander the Great's father, the ancient Greek king, Philip II of Macedon (aka Philippos, Filippos, and Pilipos), who was an avid horse lover. The name is commonly shortened to the nicknames Pippa, Pippy, Pippita, Pipka, Pippulina, and Pip. Notable people with the name Philippa include:

Pre-modern era
Saint Philippa (died 220), Christian martyr and saint
Philippa of Hainault (c.1310/15–1369), queen consort of Edward III of England
Philippa Roet (c. 1346–c. 1387), wife of Geoffrey Chaucer
Philippa, 5th Countess of Ulster (1355–1382), granddaughter of Edward III of England
Philippa of Lancaster (1360–1415), English princess, consort queen of Portugal
Philippa of England (1394–1430), daughter of King Henry IV of England, Queen of Sweden, Denmark and Norway
Philippa of Coimbra (1437–1497), Portuguese noblewoman and nun

Modern era
Philippa Boyens (born 1962), New Zealand screenwriter
Pip Courtney, Australian journalist and television presenter
Philippa Cullen (1950–1975), Australian performance artist
Philippa Dunne, Irish actress and writer
Philippa Fawcett (1868–1948), English mathematician and educationalist
Philippa Foot (1920–2010), British philosopher
Philippa Forrester (born 1968), British television presenter and producer
Philippa Gregory (born 1954), British novelist
Pippa Mann (born 1983), British racing car driver
Pippa Middleton (born 1983), English socialite, author, and sister of Catherine, Duchess of Cambridge
Philippa Pearce (1920–2006), English children's author
Philippa Schuyler (1931–1967), American pianist and child prodigy
Phillipa Soo (born 1990), American actress/singer
Pip Tomson (born 1977), English journalist and presenter
Philippa Whipple (born 1966), British high court judge and barrister
Philippa Whitford (born 1958), Scottish politician and breast surgeon
Philippa York (born 1958), Scottish journalist and former professional cyclist

See also

Filipa

References

English feminine given names
English-language feminine given names
Feminine given names
Greek feminine given names
Given names of Greek language origin